This is a list of fossiliferous stratigraphic units in the Northwest Territories, Canada.

References

 

Northwest Territories
.fossiliferous